The precise taxonomy of the genus Allium is still poorly understood with incorrect descriptions being widespread. With over 850 species distributed over the Northern hemisphere Allium is the sole genus in the Allieae, one of four tribes of subfamily Allioideae (Amaryllidaceae). New species continue to be described and Allium is both highly variable and one of the largest monocotyledonous genera, but the precise taxonomy of Allium is poorly understood, with incorrect descriptions being widespread. The difficulties arise from the fact that the genus displays considerable polymorphism and has adapted to a wide variety of habitats. Furthermore, traditional classications had been based on homoplasious characteristics (what turn out to be independently evolved similar features in species from different lineages). However, the genus has been shown to be monophyletic, containing three major clades, although some proposed subgenera are not. Some progress is being made using molecular phylogenetic methods, and the internal transcribed spacer (ITS) region, including the 5.8S rDNA and the two spacers ITS1 and ITS2, is one of the more commonly used markers in the study of the differentiation of the Allium species.

Allium includes a number of taxonomic groupings previously considered separate genera (Caloscordum Herb., Milula Prain and Nectaroscordum Lindl.) Allium spicatum had been treated by many authors as Milula spicata, the only species in the monospecific genus Milula. In 2000, it was shown to be embedded in Allium.

Description 

The genus Allium are herbaceous geophytes is characterised by bulbs enclosed in membranous tunics, that may become fibrous and may be carried on rhizomes, with tepals that are free or almost free, and a subgynobasic style. The majority of species produce cysteine sulphoxides that are the source of their distinctive garlic and onion odor and taste. About twenty species are grown as edible crops, such as onions, garlic and leeks, while others are foraged from the wild, such as ramps. Many species are xerophytic and the over 850 species are found almost exclusively in the Northern hemisphere, being particularly diverse in the warm dry summers and cool wet winters of the Mediterranean. The main centre of diversity is the Old World with species rich areas in Central Asia as well as the Mediterranean Basin. A second centre, in the New World, is western North America.

History 

Descriptions of Allium taxonomy date back at least as far as Carolus Clusius' Rariarum plantarum historia (1601). When Linnaeus formerly described the genus Allium in his Species Plantarum (1753), there were thirty species with this name. He placed Allium in a grouping he referred to as Hexandria monogynia (i.e. six stamens and one pistil) containing 51 genera in all. In 1763, Michel Adanson, who proposed the concept of families of plants, included Allium and related genera as a grouping within 'Liliaceae' as Section IV, Les Oignons (Onions), or Cepae in Latin. De Jussieu is officially recognised as the first formal establishment of the suprageneric grouping into families (Ordo) in 1789. In this system Allium was one of fourteen genera in Ordo VI, Asphodeles (Asphodeli), of the third class (Stamina epigyna) of Monocots. Jean Henri Jaume Saint-Hilaire (1805), who developed the concept of Amaryllidaceae, continued Jussieu's treatment of Allium under Asphodeli (which he considered synonymous with Adanson's Liliaceae and Jussieu's Asphodeli). He placed Allium in an unnamed monotypic section of Asphodeli defined as Fleurs en ombelle, racine bulbeuse. Calice à six parties egales (umbellate flowers, bulbous, calyx of six equal parts).

Subsequently, de Candolle reverted the family name back to Liliaceae from Asphodeli. He divided the Liliaceae into a series of Ordres, and the second ordre was named Asphodèles, based on Jussieus' family of that name, in which he placed Allium. The term 'Alliaceae' then reappeared in its subfamilial form, Allieae, in Dumortier's Florula Belgica (1827), with six genera. The 'Alliaceae' have been treated as Allieae within the family Liliaceae (or Aspholecaceae, a partial synonym) by most authorities since.

Regel produced a major monograph of the genus in 1875, and this remained the major reference work for over 100 years till the molecularly based study of Friesen and colleagues in 2006. Despite recent advances the precise taxonomy of Allium remains still poorly understood with incorrect descriptions being widespread.

Phylogeny

Subdivision 

Linnaeus originally grouped his 30 species into three alliances, e.g. Foliis caulinis planis and as the number of recognised species increased, so did the number of subgroups. Since then, many attempts have been made to divide the growing number of recognised species into infrageneric subgroupings, initially as sections, and then as subgenera further divided into sections. For a brief history, see Friesen et al. (2006) and Li et al. (2010) Regel's 1875 treatise on Allium divided his 262 species between the six sections proposed by Don, in his 1832 monograph on the genus. Stearn (1944) described 14 subgenera. Traub (1968) described 3 subgenera, 36 sections and subsections and about 600 species. By 1992 there were 6 sub-genera, 50 sections and subsections and 600–700 species. The situation was further confused by the presence of over 1,000 taxonomic names, many of which turned out to be synonyms.

The modern era of phylogenetic analysis dates to 1996. In 2006 Friesen, Fritsch, and Blattner described a new classification with 15 subgenera, 56 sections, and about 780 species based on the nuclear ribosomal gene internal transcribed spacers. Some of the subgenera correspond to the once separate genera (Caloscordum, Milula, Nectaroscordum) included in the Gilliesieae. The terminology has varied with some authors subdividing subgenera into Sections and others Alliances.

The term alliance has been used for both subgroupings within species, e.g. Allium nigrum, as well as infrageneric subsections. These alliances are informal groupings based on morphological similarity and reflecting hypotheses of evolutionary relationship. and can be used between any two formal ranks. For instance the some 70 North American species were divided into nine well-defined species alliances, of which the largest was the Allium falcifolium alliance with 31 taxa. These alliances are usually referred to as the Ownbey alliances, after Marion Ownbey and were also used by Traub. A number of classification schemes have chosen to retain these, the Traub system not being universally accepted.

Subsequent molecular phylogenetic studies have shown the 2006 classification is a considerable improvement over previous classifications, but some of its subgenera and sections are probably not monophyletic. Meanwhile, the number of new species continued to increase, reaching 800 by 2009, 900 by 2016 and the pace of discovery has not decreased. Detailed studies have focused on a number of subgenera, including Amerallium. Amerallium is strongly supported as monophyletic. Subgenus Melanocrommyum has also been the subject of considerable study (see below), while work on subgenus Allium has focused on section Allium, including Allium ampeloprasum, although sampling was not sufficient to test the monophyly of the section.

The major evolutionary lineages or lines correspond to the three major clades. Line one (the oldest) with three subgenera is predominantly bulbous, the second, with five subgenera and the third with seven subgenera contain both bulbous and rhizomatous taxa. Banfi and colleagues (2011) have suggested that the phylogenetic trichotomy of this genus Allium sensu lato is sufficiently distinct as to warrant splitting it into three separate genera. Banfi's scheme thus proposes the restoring the three originally separate genera Nectaroscordum Lindl. (type: N. siculum), Caloscordum Herb. (type: C. neriniflorum) and Allium L. sensu stricto (type: A. sativum) to correspond to lines 1-3.

Evolutionary lines and subgenera 

The three evolutionary lineages and 15 subgenera here represent the classification schemes of Friesen et al. (2006) and Li (2010), and subsequent additional species and revisions.

Evolutionary lines and subgenera (number of sections/number of species)
 First evolutionary line (3 subgenera)
 Nectaroscordum (Lindl.) Asch. et Graebn  Type: Allium siculum (1/3) Mediterranean bells, Sicilian honey garlic
 Microscordum (Maxim.) N. Friesen Type: Allium monanthum (1/1)
 Amerallium Traub Type: Allium canadense (12/135)  
 Second evolutionary line (5 subgenera)
 Caloscordum (Herb.) R. M. Fritsch Type: Allium neriniflorum (1/3)
 Anguinum (G. Don ex Koch) N. Friesen Type: Allium victorialis (1/12)
 Porphyroprason (Ekberg) R. M. Fritsch Type: Allium oreophilum (1/1)
 Vvedenskya (Kamelin) R. M. Fritsch Type: Allium kujukense (1/1)
 Melanocrommyum (Webb et Berthel.) Rouy Type: Allium nigrum (20/160)
 Third evolutionary line (7 subgenera)
 Butomissa (Salisb.) N. Friesen Type: Allium ramosum (2/4)  fragrant garlic 
 Cyathophora R. M. Fritsch Type: Allium cyathophorum (3/5)
 Rhizirideum (G. Don ex Koch) Wendelbo s.s Type: Allium senescens (5/37)
 Allium L. Type: Allium sativum (15/300)
 Reticulatobulbosa (Kamelin) N. Friesen Type: Allium lineare (5/80)
 Polyprason Radic Type: Allium moschatum (4/50)
 Cepa (Mill.) Radic ́ Type: Allium cepa (5/30) onion, garden onion, bulb onion, common onion

First evolutionary line 

Although this lineage consists of three subgenera, nearly all the species are attributed to subgenus Amerallium, the third largest subgenus of Allium. The lineage is considered to represent the most ancient line within Allium, and to be the only lineage that is predominantly bulbous, the other two having both bulbous and rhizomatous taxa. Nectaroscordum and Microscordum are bulbous, but Amerallium contains some rhizomatous elements. Within this lineage Amerallium is a sister group to the other two subgenera (Microscordum+Nectaroscordum).

Subgenus Nectaroscordum

Disjunct distribution, involving the western Mediterranean (type species) and southwest Asia 
 Section Nectaroscordum (Lindl.) Gren. & Godr.
 Allium siculum Ucria (Syn. Nectaroscordum siculum (Ucria) Lindl.) Type
 Allium tripedale Trautv.

Subgenus Microscordum
East Asia
 Section Microscordum Maxim.
 Allium monanthum Maxim.

Subgenus Amerallium

This large monophyletic subgenus is extremely diverse, both morphologically and ecologically and is characterised by leaves with one row of vascular bundles, absence of palisade parenchyma and a subepidermal position of laticifers, with a predominant base chromosome number x=7.

Taxonomy
Amerallium is a relatively large subgenus with about 120–140 species. Under the alliance system of classification proposed by Ownbey (1966), species north of Mexico and two Mexican endemics were treated as eight informal alliances: the A. acuminatum, A. campanulatum, A. canadense, A. cernuum, A. falcifolium, A. kunthii, A. sanbornii, and A. validum alliances. Traub (1968) then arranged the New World alliances into four sections: Amerallium Traub, Caulorhizideum Traub, Lophioprason Traub, and Rhopetoprason Traub. In addition he arranged the Old World species into 6 sections.
 
Since Traub's revision of the subgenus, two biogeographical sister clades (or alliances) have been recognised. The Old World clade is represented by two relatively small groups from the Mediterranean and East Asia. The larger New World clade by all North American species of Allium. The New World sections are Lophioprason, Amerallium, and Rhophetoprason, while the Old World is represented by sections Arctoprasum, Briseis, Narkissoprason, Molium, Bromatorrhiza and Rhynchocarpum.

The subgenus is thought to originate in the Old World, with a later split, and to have its origin in the higher latitudes of East Asia, at the time of transition from Cretaceous to Tertiary, dispersing to western North America. Twelve sections were subsequently recognized, with sections Amerallium and Molium further split into two subsections.

Distribution
Amerallium is widely distributed within North America, Europe, north Africa, Ethiopia, the Caucasus, northern Iran, southeast Tibet, and southwest China. The greatest species diversity occurs in North America with 81 species recognized in the 2002 Flora of North America (north of Mexico) and a further 13 are unique to Mexico, and a total of 26 species recognised there. Within N America, the genus covers most of the area south of the 53rd parallel, including the oak hillsides of California and Oregon, deserts of Nevada and Texas, alpine meadows of Utah and Idaho, prairies of Nebraska and Manitoba, and forest glades of Missouri and Arkansas.

Uses
Both bulbous and rhizomatous species occur in both Old World and New World alliances. The subgenus includes both ornamentals, such as A. moly, A. roseum, A. unifolium and A. neapolitanum, and culinary species such as A. ursinum.

15 Sections

Section Amerallium
 Section Amerallium (Traub) Kamelin
 Allium canadense L. (Syn. Allium mutabile Michx.) Type Canadian garlic
 Allium cuthbertii  Small striped garlic
 Allium drummondii Regel (Syn. Allium nuttallii S.Watson)
 Allium geyeri S. Watson (including Allium fibrosum Regel)
 Allium textile A.Nelson & J.F.Macbr.— prairie onion

Section Arctoprasum
 Section Arctoprasum Kirschl.

 Allium ursinum L. ramsons, buckrams, wild garlic, broad-leaved garlic, wood garlic, bear's garlic

Section Briseis 
 Section Briseis (Salesb.) Stearn
 Allium paradoxum (M.Bieb.) G.Don few-flowered garlic
 Allium triquetrum L. Type three-cornered leek, triquetous garlic

Section Bromatorrhiza 
 Section Bromatorrhiza Ekberg

 Allium hookeri Thwaites
 Allium macranthum Baker (Syn. Allium oviflorum Regel)
 Allium pendulinum Ten.
 Allium wallichii Kunth (Syn. Allium polyastrum Diels, Allium wallichianum Steud. nom. nud.) Type

Section Caulorhizideum 
 Section Caulorhizideum Traub

 Allium validum S.Watson

Section Chamaeprason 
 Section Chamaeprason Hermann
 Allium brevistylum S.Watson
 Allium gooddingii Ownbey
 Allium chamaemoly L. Type

Section Lophioprason 
 Section Lophioprason Traub

 Allium acuminatum Hook. tapertip onion, Hooker's onion
 Allium amplectens Torr. (Syn. Allium attenuifolium Kellogg)
 Allium anceps Kellog  twinleaf onion
 Allium atrorubens S. Wats. dark red onion
 Allium bigelovii S.Watson
 Allium campanulatum S.Watson (Syn.: Allium bidwelliae S.Watson) dusky onion
 Allium cernuum Roth (Syn. Allium allegheniense Small) nodding onion
 Allium crispum Greene
 Allium falcifolium Hook. & Arn.
 Allium fimbriatum S.Watson
 Allium lemmonii S.Watson
 Allium munzii (Ownbey & Aase ex Traub) McNeal
 Allium nevii  S. Wats. — Nevius' garlic
 Allium praecox Brandegee
 Allium sanbornii Wood Type
 Allium siskiyouense Ownbey ex Traub
 Allium stellatum Ker Gawl.
 Allium unifolium Kellogg

Section Molium 
 Section Molium G.Don ex Koch

 Allium moly L.
 Allium neapolitanum Cirillo (Syn. Allium sieberianum Schult. & Schult.f.) white garlic
 Allium roseum L. Type
 Allium subhirsutum L. (Syn. Allium ciliatum Cirillo)
 Allium zebdanense Boiss. & Noë

Section Narkissoprason 
 Section Narkissoprason Hermann

 Allium insubricum Boiss. & Reut.
 Allium narcissiflorum Vill. (Syn.: Allium pedemontanum Willd.) Type

Other 
 Section Rhophetoprason Traub
 Allium glandulosum Link & Otto 
 Section Rhynchocarpum Brullo
 Allium ruhmerianum Aschers.
 Section Triptera Kamelin et Seisums
 Allium tripterum Nasir

Second evolutionary line 

Nearly all the species in this lineage of five subgenera are accounted for by subgenus Melanocrommyum, which is most closely associated with subgenera Vvedenskya and Porphyroprason, phylogenetically. These three genera are late-branching whereas the remaining two subgenera, Caloscordum and Anguinum are early branching. Of the five subgenera, the large Melanocrommymum and the oligo- or monotypic Caloscordum, Vvedenskya and Porphyroprason are bulbous and the remaining small subgenus Anguinum is rhizomatous.

Subgenus Caloscordum
East Asia
Sections
 Section Caloscordum (Herb.) Baker 3 spp.
 Allium neriniflorum (Herb.) Baker Type
 Allium tubiflorum Rendle

Subgenus Anguinum
Two distinct distributions:
1. Eurasian-American (A. victorialis alliance, including A. tricoccum) 2. East Asia (A. prattii, A. ovalifolium)
Sections
 Section Anguinum G.Don ex Koch. 12 spp.
 Allium microdictyon Prokh.
 Allium ochotense Prokh.
 Allium ovalifolium Hand.-Mazz.
 Allium prattii C.H.Wright
 Allium tricoccum Aiton (Syn.: Allium burdickii (Hanes) A.G.Jones) wild leek, ramp
 Allium victorialis L. Type

Subgenus Porphyroprason 

Sections
 Section Porphyroprason  Ekberg 1 sp.
 Allium oreophilum C.A.Mey. (Syn. Allium ostrowskianum Regel)

Subgenus Vvedenskya  

Sections
 Section Vvedenskya Kamelin 1 sp.
 Allium kujukense Vved.

Subgenus Melanocrommyum

This Eurasian subgenus, the second largest, is complex and has had a confusing taxonomic history and is extremely diverse, morphologically. It is distributed from the Mediterranean to the Near and Middle East, to north-western China and Pakistan in the east, and southern Siberia in the north. The centre of diversity is Central Asia where it evolved, but its ancestry is located in East Asia. The 2006 classification of Fritsch and colleagues included 150 species but this has continued to grow. An extensive molecular based study in 2010 confirmed its monophyly but showed that the traditional sections were either para- or polyphyletic. On the other hand, a number of monophyletic subgroups were recognised, with about 40 clades, although their exact relationships remained not fully resolved. Consequently, traditional sections required considerable re-alignment. Eventually 160 species and subspecies were recognised in 20 sections and 22 subsections.

Description: The subgenus is characterised by true tunicated bulbs, annual roots, leaves that are mostly broad and flat with subterranean sheath parts that are barely visible above the ground, scapes that are strong and most often strictly upright and of varying length, and large, fasciculate to globular inflorescences. The latter are composed of many moderately small to large, often star-like, flowers, and some of which have a sweet or noticeable odor.

History: Early (prior to 1950) classifications of Allium included many of the members of this subgenus within the bulbous section, Mollium based on morphological characteristics. Mollium was later raised to subgenus level (and then again reduced to a section of Amerallium after transferring many species to Melanocrommyum. The subgenus was then divided into sections in 1969. Molecular methods in the 1990s confirmed the identity of Melanocrommyum as a distinct monophyletic group, together with the presence of several subgroups, but the deeper relationships remained inconsistent.

Subdivision: Subdivision of the subgenus was first proposed by Wendelbo in 1966, proposing section Regeloprason Wendelbo, followed in 1969 by Melanocrommyum Webb & Berthel., Kaloprason K. Koch, Acanthoprason Wendelbo, Megaloprason Wendelbo, and Thaumasioprason Wendelbo. Kamelin (1973) provided an alternative arrangement of sections, which was supplanted by the Gatersleben Allium Group classification (1992) which used a broad range of variables.

The use of molecular markers to develop phylogeny began in the 1990s and showed that the subgenus was a well separated taxon with a number of subgeneric groupings. Friesen and colleagues (2006) carried out an extensive molecular phylogenetic study  resulting in a taxonomy based on 15 sections. These were then further subdivided into five of the sections to create 17 subsections. While Melanocrommyum itself appeared monophyletic, most of the sections were either para- or polyphyletic, favouring the formation of a larger number of smaller subgroups. In their study there were a number of larger sections with 15–35 species, Acmopetala, Megaloprason, Regeloprason,  Kaloprason, and Acanthoprason. The remaining sections are either oligogotypic with 2–8 species (Compactoprason, Pseudoprason, Miniprason, Brevicaule, Thaumasioprason, Verticillata) or monotypic (Acaule, Aroidea, Popovia).

In a more focused study in 2010 this was expanded to 20 sections and 22 subsections, or in some cases, e.g. section Melanocrommyum (type: A. nigrum) into nine alliances and Acanthoprason into seven. This section is the most diverse one within the subgenus in which subgroups differ according to the relationships of the lengths of leaves and scapes (leaves shorter, equal or longer than scapes) and inflorescences (fasciculate, umbellate or subglobose). The increased number of sections resulted from the splitting of some of the earlier sections, such as Acmopetala. The two species in the resulting section Longibidentata are sister to all the remaining sections (core clade). This section, together with another new section, Decipientia form the basal clade. Although Li et al. (2010) included three sections, their study was confined to species endemic to China.

Uses: The subgenus also contains many species grown as ornamentals, such as A. giganteum, A. cristophii, A. schubertii, A. aflatunense, A. atropurpureum, A. nigrum and A. karataviense. These species are predominantly from Southwestern and Central Asia, where they are used for both culinary and medicinal purposes. The latter usage is associated with the presence of cysteine sulphoxides and also radical scavenger activity, although many members of the subgenus possess less of these compounds and lack the distinctive taste and smell of garlic and onion, their properties appear to be associated with dithiodipyrroles and sulfur-pyridins. These substances also occur in the ornamental species, that were introduced into European and North American gardens in the early 19th century, and now are represented by an increasing number of named cultivars and hybrids. Cysteine sulphoxides are also largely responsible for the flavour and spicy taste of these species, predominantly the isomeric cysteine derivatives alliin and isoalliin.

15 sections

 Section Acanthoprason Type A. akaka
 Section Acaule Type A. hexaceras
 Section Acmopetala Type A. backhousianum
 7 subsections
 Section Aroidea Type A. aroides
 Section Asteroprason Type  A. elburzense
 2 subsections
 Section Brevicaule Type A. sergii
 Section Compactoprason Type A. giganteum
 3 subsections
 Section Decipientia Type A. decipiens
 Section Kaloprason Type A. caspium
 3 subsections
 Section Longibidentata Type A. fetisowii
 Section Megaloprason Type A. rosenbachianum
 4 subsections
 Section Melanocrommyum Type A. nigrum
 Section Miniprason Type A. karataviense
 Section Popovia Type A. gypsaceum
 Section Procerallium Type Allium stipitatum
 2 subsections
 Section Pseudoprason Type A. koelzii
 Section Regeloprason Type A. regelii
 3 subsections
 Section Stellata Type A. taeniopetalum
 Section Thaumasioprason Type A. mirum
 Section Verticillata Type A. verticillatum

Sections
 Section Acanthoprason Wendelbo

 Allium akaka alliance 
 Allium akaka S.G.Gmel. ex Schult. & Schult. f. Type
 Allium austroiranicum alliance
 Allium austroiranicum R.M. Fritsch
 Allium derderianum alliance
 Allium breviscapum Stapf
 Allium derderianum Regel
 Allium haemanthoides alliance 
 Allium haemanthoides Boiss. & Reut. ex Regel s. str.
 Allium zagricum R. M. Fritsch
 Allium materculae alliance
 Allium graveolens (R.M.Fritsch) R.M.Fritsch
 Allium materculae Bordz.
 Allium minutiflorum alliance
 Allium hamedanense R. M. Fritsch
 Allium minutiflorum Regel
 Allium ubipetrense alliance
 Allium ubipetrense R. M. Fritsch (Syn. Allium haemanthoides var. lanceolatum Boiss)
 Section Acaule R.M.Fritsch
 Allium hexaceras Vved.
 Section Acmopetala R.M.Fritsch
 Subsection Acmopetala R. M. Fritsch 
 Allium aflatunense B.Fedtsch. non hort. flowering onion
 Allium backhousianum Regel (Syn. Allium gulczense O. Fedtsch.) Type (section and subsection)
 Subsection Albidiflora R. M. Fritsch
 Allium saposhnikovii Nikitina (Syn. Allium collis-magni Kamelin)
 Subsection Durovaginata R. M. Fritsch 
 Allium costatovaginatum Kamelin & Levichev Type
 Allium severtzovioides R.M. Fritsch
 Subsection Inornatae R. M. Fritsch
 Allium sewerzowii Regel Type
 Allium tashkenticum F. O. Khass. & R. M. Fritsch (Syn. Allium collis-magni auct. non Kamelin)
 Subsection Pharmakoprason R. M. Fritsch
 Allium tschimganicum B.Fedtsch. (Syn. Allium motor Kamelin & Levichev)
 Section Aroidea Khass. & R.M.Fritsch
 Allium aroides Vved. et Popov
 Section Asteroprason R. M. Fritsch
 Subsect Asteroprason R. M. Fritsch 
 Allium elburzense Wendelbo Type (section and subsection)
 Allium helicophyllum Vved.
 Allium monophyllum Vved.
 Subsection Christophiana T Scholok.
 Allium cristophii Trautv. (Syn. Allium albopilosum C.H.Wright, Allium walteri Regel, Allium bodeanum Regel nom. rej., Allium christophii Trautv. orth. var.) Type

 Allium ellisii Hook.f
 Section Brevicaule R.M.Fritsch
 Allium badakhshanicum Wendelbo
 Allium chitralicum Wang et Tang s. str. (Syn. Allium pauli Vved.)
 Allium sergii Vved. Type
 Section Compactoprason R.M.Fritsch

 Subsection Erectopetala F. O. K Hass.
 Allium giganteum Regel Type (section and subsection) giant onion
 Allium macleanii Baker (Syn. Allium elatum Regel)
 Subsection Komaroviana F. O. Khass. & R. M. Fritsch
 Allium komarowii Lipsky
 Subsection Spiralopetala F. O. Khass. & R. M. Fritsch
 Allium majus Vved.
 Section Decipientia (O Melczuk) R.M.Fritsch
 Allium chelotum Wendelbo
 Allium decipiens Fisch. ex Schult. & Schult. f. Type
 Allium grande Lipsky
 Allium roborowskianum Regel
 Allium robustum Kar.&Kir.
 Allium sinkiangense F.T. Wang & Y.C. Tang
 Allium tulipifolium Ledeb.
 Allium viridulum Ledeb.
 Section Kaloprason C.Koch
 Subsection Kaloprason (K. Koch) Kamelin s. str.
 Allium caspium (Pall.) M. Bieb. Type (section and subsection)
 Allium bucharicum Regel
 Subsection Ligulifolia R. M. Fritsch
 Allium alexeianum Regel s. str.
 Allium hindukuschense Kamelin & Seisums
 Subsect Schubertia Kamelin
 Allium schubertii Zucc.
 Section Longibidentata (R.M.Fritsch) R.M.Fritsch
 Allium fetisowii Regel  (Syn. Allium simile Regel) Type
 Allium chychkanense R. M. Fritsch
 Section Megaloprason Wendelbo
 Subsection Humilicognata R. M. Fritsch
 Allium assadii Seisums (Syn. Allium brachyscapum sensu Wendelbo)
 Allium brachyscapum Vved. Type 
 Allium scotostemon Wendelbo
 Subsection Keratoprason R. M. Fritsch
 Allium sarawschanicum Regel (Syn. Allium pseudozeravschanicum Popov & Vved. ex B. Fedtsch & Popov) 
 Subsection Megaloprason R. M. Fritsch
 Allium insufficiens Vved.
 Allium rosenbachianum Regel Type (section and subsection)
 Subsection Spiralitunicata R. M. Fritsch
 Allium fibriferum Wendelbo
 Allium suworowii Regel Type
 Section Melanocrommyum Webb & Berthel. s.s.

 Allium asclepiadeum alliance
 Allium asclepiadeum Bornm.
 Allium chrysantherum Boiss.& Reut. (Syn. Allium reflexum Boiss.& Reut. non F. Dietr.)
 Allium eginense Freyn
 Allium kharputense Freyn & Sint.
 Allium nemrutdaghense Kit Tan & Sorger
 Allium olivieri Boiss.
 Allium saralicum R. M. Fritsch
 Allium shatakiense Rech.f.
 Allium stenopetalum Boiss. & Kotschy
 Allium urmiense Kamelin & Seisums
 Allium bisotunense alliance
 Allium bisotunense R. M. Fritsch
 Allium cardiostemon alliance
 Allium cardiostemon Fisch. & C.A.Mey. (Syn. Allium atriphoeniceum Bornm., Allium nabelekii Kamelin & Seisums, Allium trilophostemon Bornm.
 Allium mariae Bordz.
 Allium colchicifolium alliance
 Allium colchicifolium Boiss.
 Allium libani Boiss. Lebanese onion
 Allium multibulbosum alliance
 Allium atropurpureum Waldst. & Kit.
 Allium cyrilli Ten.
 Allium multibulbosum Jacq. (Syn. Allium nigrum auct. non L.)
 Allium nigrum alliance
 Allium nigrum L. (Syn. Allium afrum (Zuccagni) Kunth, Allium magicum L., nom. rej., Allium bauerianum Baker) Type black garlic
 Allium struzlianum Ogan.
 Allium noëanum alliance
 Allium karamanoglui Koyuncu & Kollmann
 Allium noëanum Reut. ex Regel (Syn. Allium dilutum Stapf, Allium jenischianum Regel)
 Allium orientale alliance
 Allium aschersonianum Barbey
 Allium dumetorum Feinbrun & Szel.
 Allium orientale Boiss.
 Allium tel-avivense Eig
 Allium tubergenii Freyn
 Allium rothii alliance
 Allium rothii Zucc.
 Allium vinicolor Wendelbo
 Section Miniprason R.M.Fritsch monotypic

  Allium karataviense Regel (Syn. Allium cabulicum Baker, Allium singulifolium Rech. f.; ? incl. subsp. henrikii Ruksans)
 Section Popovia Khass. & R.M.Fritsch
 Allium gypsaceum Popov et Vved.
 Section Procerallium R. M. Fritsch
 Subsection Elatae R. M. Fritsch 
 Allium stipitatum Regel Type (subsection and section) Persian shallot
 Allium altissimum Regel
  Subsection Costatae R. M. Fritsch
 Allium hollandicum  R. M. Fritsch (Syn. Allium aflatunense hort. non B. Fedtsch.) flowering onion
 Allium jesdianum Boiss. & Buhse Type
 Allium rosenorum R.M. Fritsch (Syn. Allium rosenbachianum auct. non Regel)
 Section Pseudoprason (Wendelbo) K.Persson & Wendelbo
 Allium hooshidaryae Mashayekhi, Zarre & R.M.Fritsch
 Allium koelzii (Wendelbo) K.Perss. et Wendelbo Type
 Section Regeloprason Wendelbo

 Subsection Diffusoumbellata R. M. Fritsch
 Allium balkhanicum (R. M. Fritsch & F.O.Khass.) R. M. Fritsch
 Allium cathodicarpum Wendelbo
 Allium cupuliferum Regel Type
 Allium iliense Regel 
 Allium isakulii R. M. Fritsch & F.O.Khass. (Syn. Allium cupuliferum sensu Kamelin subsp. nuratense Kamelin)
 Allium subkopetdagense (R. M. Fritsch & F.O. Khass.) R. M. Fritsch
 Subsection Odoratae R. M. Fritsch
 Allium chodsha-bakirganicum Gaffarov & Turakulov
 Allium darwasicum Regel Type
 Allium hissaricum Vved.
 Allium intradarvazicum R. M. Fritsch*** Allium lipskyanum Vved.
 Allium pseudowinklerianum R. M. Fritsch & F.O. Khass
 Allium sochense R. M. Fritsch & U. Turakulov
 Allium winklerianum Regel
 Subsection Regeloprason (Wendelbo) Kamelin
 Allium regelii Trautv. Type
 Allium victoris Vved.
 Section Stellata (F.O. Khass. & R.M. Fritsch) R.M. Fritsch
 Allium taeniopetalum Popov & Vved. (Syn.: Allium baschkyzylsaicum Krassovsk., Allium mogoltavicum Vved.)
 Section Thaumasioprason Wendelbo
 Allium caroli-henrici Wendelbo
 Allium cucullatum Wendelbo
 Allium khozratense R. M. Fritsch
 Allium mirum Wendelbo Type
 Section Verticillata Kamelin
 Allium verticillatum Regel

Third evolutionary line 

The third evolutionary line contains the most number of subgenera (seven) and also the largest subgenus of the genus Allium, subgenus Allium which includes the type species of the genus, Allium sativum. This subgenus also contains the majority of the species in the line. Within the lineage the phylogeny is complex. Two small subgenera Butomissa and Cyathophora form a sister clade to the remaining five subgenera, with Butomissa as the first branching group. Amongst the remaining five subgenera, Rhizirideum forms a medium-sized subgenus that is the sister to the other four larger subgenera. However, they may not be monophyletic. Of the seven subgenera, the large subgenus Allium, represents the bulbous elelement.

Subgenus Butomissa 

2 sections
 Section Austromontana Type A. oreoprasum
 Section Butomissa Type A. ramosum

Sections
 Section Austromontana N.Friesen
Mountains from eastern to central Asia up to the borderline of the eastern Mediterranean
 Allium gilgiticum Wang & Tang
 Allium oreoprasum Schrenk Type
 Section Butomissa (Salisb.) Kamelin
Siberian–Mongolian–North Chinese steppes
 Allium ramosum L. (Syn. Allium odorum L., Allium tataricum L. f., Allium lancipetalum Y.P.Hsu, Allium potaninii Regel, Allium weichanicum Palibin) Type
 Allium tuberosum Rottler ex Spreng Chinese chives

Subgenus Cyathophora 

Asia (Tibet and the Himalayas)

3 sections
 Section Coleoblastus Type A. mairei
 Section Cyathophora Type A. cyathophorum
 Section Milula  Type A. spicatum

Sections
 Section Coleoblastus Ekberg
 Allium auriculatum Kunth
 Allium mairei H.Lév. (Syn. Allium yunnanense Diels) Type
 Section Cyathophora R.M.Fritsch
 Allium cyathophorum Bureau & Franch 
 Section Milula (Prain) Friesen
 Allium spicatum (Prain) N.Friesen

Subgenus Rhizirideum 

~ 37 species. Eurasian steppes, with greatest diversity in southern Siberia and Mongolia. Only a few species distributed in Europe, with Portugal as most western point. Some species occur also in Korea and far eastern Russia, and one in Japan.

5 sections
 Section Caespitosoprason Type A. polyrhizum
 Section Eduardia Type A. eduardii
 Section Rhizirideum Type A. senescens
 Section Rhizomatosa Type A. caespitosum
 Section Tenuissima Type A. tenuissimum

Sections
 Section Caespitosoprason N.Friesen
 Allium bidentatum Fisch. ex Prokh.
 Allium mongolicum Regel
 Allium polyrhizum Turcz. ex Regel Type
 Allium przewalskianum Regel
 Allium subangulatum Regel
 Section Eduardia N.Friesen
 Allium eduardii Stearn 
 Section Rhizirideum G.Don ex Koch 
 Allium albidum Fisch. ex M.Bieb.
 Allium angulosum L. mouse garlic
 Allium austrosibiricum N.Friesen
 Allium burjaticum N.Friesen
 Allium denudatum Redouté (Syn. Allium albidum Fisch. ex M.Bieb.)
 Allium lusitanicum Lam. (Syn. Allium fallax Schult. & Schult. f., Allium montanum F.W.Schmidt)
 Allium minus S.Yu, W.Lee & S.Lee
 Allium nutans L.
 Allium prostratum Trevir.
 Allium pseudosenescens H.J.Choi & B.U.Oh 
 Allium rubens Schrad. ex Willd.
 Allium senescens L. (Syn. Allium baicalense Willd., Allium glaucum Schrad. ex Poir.) Type
 Allium spirale Willd.
 Allium spurium G.Don (Syn. Allium dauricum N.Friesen, Allium saxicola Kitag.)
 Allium stellerianum Willd.
 Section Rhizomatosa Egor.
 Allium caespitosum Siev.
 Section Tenuissima (Tzag.) Hanelt
 Allium anisopodium Ledeb.
 Allium tenuissimum L. Type
 Allium vodopjanovae N.Friesen

Subgenus Allium 

Subgenus Allium, the youngest of the subgenera, is predominantly Mediterranean but its distribution extends east towards Central Asia. This very large subgenus is divided into 15 - 16 sections and demonstrates two main groups. One has been referred to as classical Allium with tripartite inner filaments and only one thick storage cataphyll. The other is more diverse morphologically reflected in less closely related sections. A number of sections appear to be non-monophyletic, including Avulsea, Pallasia, Brevispatha and Kopetdagia. It includes both ornamentals, such as A. sphaerocephalon, A. caeruleum, A. carinatum and A. flavum as well as food crops such as A. sativum and A. ampeloprasum.

16 Sections
 Section Allium Type A. sativum
 Section Avulsea Type A. rubellum
 Section Brevidentia Type A. brevidens
 Section Brevispatha Type A. parciflorum
 Section Caerulea Type A. caeruleum
 Section Codonoprasum Type A. oleraceum
 Section Costulatae Type A. filidens
 Section Crystallina Type A. crystallinum
 Section Eremoprasum Type A. sabulosum
 Section Kopetdagia Type A. kopedeganse
 Section Longivaginata Type A. longivaginatum
 Section Minuta Type A. minutum 
 Section Mediasia Type A. turkestanicum
 Section Multicaulea Type A. lehmannianum 
 Section Pallasia Type A. pallasii
 Section Spathulata Type A. spathulatum

Sections

Section Allium 
This is the largest section with about 114 species, a number of which are economically important, such as A. sativum (garlic) and A. ampeloprasum (leek). This section also expresses frequent polyploidy and contains a number of species whose boundaries have been difficult to establish, notably A. ampeloprasum which includes a number of subspecies and varieties, as well as synonymous species, which have been labelled the "A. ampeloprasum complex". Horticulturally, it is represented by at least four groups, including leeks, whose exact ancestry has been considered uncertain. In the molecular phylogenetic study by Hirschegger and colleagues (2010) showed section Allium to be a well supported clade with two main subclades, one of which included two smaller clades. All of the tetraploid forms of A. ampeloprasum were resolved in a single clade, and leeks appeared to be more closely allied to A. iranicum and A. atroviolaceum than A. ampeloprasum. Restoration of A. porrum L. was therefore proposed for the tertraploid forms, reserving A. ampeloprasum for the forms known horticulturally as great headed garlic and A. ampeloprasum var. babingtonii.

 Section Allium L.
 Allium acutiflorum Lois.
 Allium affine Ledeb.
 Allium amethystinum Tausch (Syn.: Allium stojanovii Kov.)
 Allium ampeloprasum L. (Syn. Allium babingtonii Borrer, Allium scorodoprasum var. babingtonii (Borrer) Regel, Allium kurrat Schweinf. ex K.Krause) (broadleaf) wild leek
 Allium artemisietorum Eig & Feinbrun
 Allium atroviolaceum Boiss. (Syn.: Allium ampeloprasum var. atroviolaceum (Boiss.) Regel)
 Allium aucheri Boiss. (Syn.: Allium caerulescens Boiss.)
 Allium bourgeaui Rech.f.
 Allium commutatum Guss.
 Allium curtum Boiss. & Gaill.
 Allium dictyoprasum C.A.Mey. ex Kunth
 Allium dilatatum Zahar.
 Allium dregeanum Kunth
 Allium ebusitanum Font Quer (Syn.: Allium durandoi (Batt. & Trab.) Seregin, Allium sphaerocephalon var. durandoi Batt. & Trab.)
 Allium ekimianum Ekşi, Koyuncu & Özkan
 Allium fuscoviolaceum Fomin
 Allium gramineum K.Koch (Syn.: Allium fominianum Miscz. ex Grossh. & Schischk.)
 Allium guttatum Steven (Syn.: Allium dalmaticum A.Kern. ex Janch., Allium margaritaceum Sm., Allium sardoum Moris)
 Allium heldreichii Boiss.
 Allium iranicum (Wendelbo) Wendelbo
 Allium jubatum J.F.Macbr.
 Allium leucanthum K.Koch
 Allium macrochaetum Boiss. & Hausskn.
 Allium melitense (Somm. & Caruana) Cif. & Giacom.(Syn. Allium ampeloprasum var. melitense Sommier & Caruana ex Borg.)
 Allium polyanthum Schult. & Schult. f.
 Allium ponticum Miscz. ex Grossh.
 Allium porrum L. (Syn. A. ampeloprasum var. porrum (L.) J.Gay)
 Allium pseudoampeloprasum Miscz. ex Grossh.
 Allium pyrenaicum Costa & Vayr.
 Allium rotundum L. (Syn. Allium jajlae Vved., Allium cilicium Boiss., Allium waldsteinii G.Don)
 Allium sativum L. (Syn.: Allium longicuspis Regel) Type garlic
 Allium scorodoprasum L. sand leek
 Allium sphaerocephalon L. (Syn. Allium descendens L.)
 Allium truncatum (Feinbrun) Kollmann & Zohary (Syn.: Allium ampeloprasum var. truncatum Feinbrun)
 Allium tuncelianum (Kollmann) Özhatay et al. Tunceli garlic, Ovacik garlic
 Allium vineale L. (Syn. Allium kochii Lange, Allium vineale var. purpureum  H.P.G.Koch) crow garlic, wild garlic

Section Avulsea 
 Section Avulsea F.O.Khass.
 Allium rubellum M.Bieb. (Syn. Allium albanum Grossh.) Type
 Allium umbilicatum Boiss.

Section Brevidentia 
 Section Brevidentia F.O.Khass. et Iengalycheva
 Allium brevidens Vved.
 Allium haneltii F.O.Khass. & R.M.Fritsch

Section Brevispatha 
 Section Brevispatha Valsecchi
 Allium lojaconoi Brullo, Lanfr. & P.Pavone
 Allium parciflorum Brullo, Lanfr. & P.Pavone Type

Section Caerulea 
 Section Caerulea (Omelcz.) F.O.Khass.
 Allium caeruleum Pall. (Syn. Allium azureum Ledeb., Allium viviparum Kar. & Kir.) Type blue globe onion
 Allium caesium Schrenk (Syn.: Allium urceolatum Regel)
 Allium delicatulum J.F.E.Siev. ex Schult. & Schult. f.

Section Codonoprasum 

Section Codonoprason is strongly monophyletic and has its centre of diversity in the Mediterranean region, particularly Greece and Turkey, but extends to other areas of Europe, North Africa and the Middle East. It was originally conceived of as a separate genus, Codonoprasum by Reichenbach in 1828. The taxonomy of the section is complicated with inconsistent speciation. In 2005 the section was considered to consist of 58 species and 7 subspecies. The section is characterised as large plants with multiflowered inflorescences, long pedicels, very long spathe valves and a cylindrical-campanulate perigon, with unequal and long-caudate spathe leaves.

Historically the section has been considered to have a number of subsections. Friesen recognised 2, while others have described 3, e.g.;
 Codonoprasum (Rchb.) Kamelin 
 Longistamineum Cheshm. ex Omelczuk
 Haemoprason (F. Herm.) Cheshm.

Many species were previously included in a grouping referred to as the Paniculatum complex. Molecular studies demonstrate the presence of two clades within the section. Clade A contains the two autumn flowering species, Allium tardans and Allium parciflorum as a subclade. Clade B contains the smaller taxa within the section.

 Section Codonoprasum Reichenb. 
 Allium agrigentinum Brullo & Pavone
 Allium apergii Trigas, Iatrou & Tzanoudakis
 Allium apolloniensis B. Biel, Kit Tan & Tzanoud.
 Allium brulloi Salmeri
 Allium candargyi Karavok. & Tzanoud.
 Allium carinatum L. (Syn.: Allium pulchellum G.Don)
 Allium castellanense (Garbari, Miceli & Raimondo) Brullo, Guglielmo, Pavone & Salmeri
 Allium chloranthum Boiss.
 Allium dentiferum Webb & Berthel 
 Allium desertorum Forssk.
 Allium dodecanesii Karavokyrou & Tzanoudak
 Allium dirphianum Brullo, Guglielmo, Pavone, Salmeri & Terrasi
 Allium dumanii Koyuncu & Koçyiğit
 Allium exile Boiss. & Orph.
 Allium flavum L. (Syn.: Allium paczoskianum Tuzson)
 Allium garganicum Brullo, Pavone, Salmeri & Terrasi
 Allium guicciardii Heldr.
 Allium kunthianum Vved. (Syn.: Allium lepidum Kunth)
 Allium lehmanii Lojac.
 Allium melanantherum Pančić
 Allium occultum Tzanoudakis & Trigas
 Allium oleraceum L. Type field garlic
 Allium pallens L. (Syn.: Allium coppoleri Tineo)
 Allium paniculatum L. (Syn.: Allium karsianum Fomin)
 Allium parciflorum Viv.
 Allium parnassicum (Boiss.) Halacsy
 Allium phitosianum Brullo, Guglielmo, Pavone, Salmeri & Terrasi
 Allium pilosum Sm.
 Allium platakisii Tzanoud. & Kypr.
 Allium pseudoflavum Vved.
 Allium rausii Brullo, Guglidmo, Pavone, Salmeri & Terrasi
 Allium rupestre Steven (Syn.: Allium charaulicum Fomin)
 Allium savii Parl.
 Allium stamineum Boiss.
 Allium tardans Greuter & Zahar.
 Allium telmatum Bogdanovic, Brullo, Giusso & Salmeri
 Allium tenuiflorum Ten.

Section Costulatae 
 Section Costulatae F.O.Khass. & Yengal.
 Allium filidens Regel Type
 Allium turcomanicum Regel

Other 
 Section Crystallina F.O.Khass. & Yengalycheva
 Allium crystallinum Vved.
 Section Eremoprasum (Kamelin) F.O.Khass. ex R.M.Fritsch & N.Friesen
 Allium sabulosum Steven ex Bunge Type
 Section Kopetdagia F. O. Khassanov
 Allium kopetdagense Vved.
 Section Longivaginata (Kamelin) F.O.Khass. ex R.M.Fritsch & N.Friesen
 Allium longivaginatum Wendelbo
 Section Minuta F. O. Khassanov
  Allium minutum Vved.
 Section Mediasia F.O.Khass., Yengalycheva & N.Friesen
 Allium turkestanicum Regel
 Section Multicaulea F.O.Khass. & Yengalycheva
 Allium lehmannianum Merckl. ex Bunge
 Section Pallasia (Tzag.) F.O.Khass. ex R.M.Fritsch & N.Friesen
 Allium pallasii Murray Type
 Allium tanguticum Regel
 Section Spathulata F.O. Khass. & R.M.Fritsch
 Allium spathulatum Khass. & R.M.Fritsch
 Unplaced
 Allium macrostemon Bunge  (Syn. Allium grayi Regel, Allium nipponicum Franch. & Sav.)

Subgenus Reticulatobulbosa 

The second largest subgenus in the third evolutionary line.
5 sections.
 Section Campanulata Type A. xiphopetalum
 Section Nigrimontana Type A. drobovii
 Section Reticulatobulbosa Type A. lineare
 Section Scabriscapa Type A. scabriscapum
 Section Sikkimensia Type A. sikkimense

Sections
 Section Campanulata Kamelin
 Allium barsczewskii Lipsky
 Allium drepanophyllum Vved.
 Allium inconspicuum Vved.
 Allium jodanthum Vved.
 Allium xiphopetalum Aitch. Type
 Section Nigrimontana N.Friesen
 Kazakhstan
 Allium drobovii Vved. Type
 Allium oreoprasoides Vved.
 Section Reticulatobulbosa Kamelin
 Allium amphibolum Ledeb.
 Allium clathratum Ledeb.
 Allium eriocoleum Vved.
 Allium flavidum Ledeb.
 Allium flavovirens Regel (Syn. Allium leucocephalum Turcz. ex Vved., Allium schischkinii K.Sobol.)
 Allium koreanum H.J.Choi & B.U.Oh
 Allium lineare L. Type
 Allium pseudostrictum Albov
 Allium splendens Willd.
 Allium strictum Schrad.
 Allium szovitsii Regel
 Section Scabriscapa (Tscholok.) N.Friesen
 Allium scabriscapum Boiss. & Kotschy (including A. eriocoleum Vved.) Type
 Allium sulphureum Vved.
 Allium trachyscordum Vved.
 Section Sikkimensia N.Friesen
Southwestern and southern China
 Allium beesianum W.W.Sm.
 Allium cyaneum Regel
 Allium sikkimense Baker (Syn. Allium kansuense Regel, Allium tibeticum Rendle) Type

Subgenus Polyprason 

4 sections
 Section Daghestanica Type A. daghestanicum
 Section Falcatifolia Type A. carolinianum
 Section Oreiprason Type A. saxatile
 Section Scorodon Type A. moschatum

Sections
 Section Daghestanica (Tscholok.) N.Friesen
 2 geographical alliances
 1. Caucasian species (A. daghestanicum, A. gunibicum)
 2. European species from the eastern Alps to the Pyrenees 
 Allium chrysanthum Regel
 Allium chrysocephalum Regel
 Allium daghestanicum Grossh. Type
 Allium ericetorum Thore (Syn. Allium ochroleucum Waldst. & Kit.)
 Allium gunibicum Miscz. ex Grossh.
 Allium herderianum Regel
 Allium kermesinum Rchb.
 Allium maowenense J.M.Xu
 Allium rude J.M.Xu
 Allium suaveolens Jacq.
 Allium xichuanense J.M.Xu
 Section Falcatifolia N.Friesen
  Montane to subalpine belt of Central Asian mountains
 Allium carolinianum DC. (Syn. Allium blandum Wall., Allium polyphyllum Kar. & Kir., Allium thomsonii Baker) Type
 Allium hymenorhizum Ledeb.
 Allium platyspathum Schrenk
 Section Oreiprason F.Herm.
 Allium albovianum Vved. (Syn. Allium gracile Albov)
 Allium consanguineum Kunth
 Allium glaciale Vved.
 Allium goloskokovii Vved.
 Allium horvatii Lovrić
 Allium kaschianum Regel
 Allium kokanicum Regel
 Allium obliquum L.
 Allium roylei Stearn
 Allium saxatile M.Bieb. (Syn. Allium globosum M.Bieb. ex DC.) Type
 Allium stracheyi Baker
 Allium talassicum Regel
 Section Scorodon Koch sensu stricto (s.s.)
 Allium frigidum Boiss. & Heldr.
 Allium jacquemontii Kunth
 Allium moschatum L. subgenus Type
 Allium popovii Vved.

Subgenus Cepa 

Polyphyletic. 5 sections.
 Section Annuloprason Type A. fedschenkoanum
 Section Cepa Type A. cepa
 Section Condensatum Type A. 
 Section Sacculiferum Type A. condensatum
 Section Schoenoprasum Type A. schoenoprasum

Sections
 Section Annuloprason T.V.Egorova
 Allium atrosanguineum Schrenk (including Allium fedschenkoanum Regel; Allium kaufmannii Regel)
 Allium fedschenkoanum Regel. Type
 Allium semenovii Regel
 Section Cepa (Mill.) Prokh.
 Allium altaicum Pall.
 Allium asarense R.M.Fritsch & Matin
 Allium cepa L. Type onion 
 Allium ×cornutum Clementi
 Allium farctum Wendelbo
 Allium fistulosum L. Welsh onion
 Allium galanthum Kar. & Kir. (Syn. Allium pseudocepa Schrenk)
 Allium oschaninii O.Fedtsch. shallot
 Allium praemixtum Vved.
 Allium ×proliferum (Moench) Schrad. ex Willd. (= A. fistulosum × A. cepa, Syn. Allium cepa var. bulbiferum Regel, Allium cepa var. proliferum (Moench) Alef., Allium cepa var. viviparum (Metzg.) Alef., Allium cepa viviparum Metzg., Allium ×wakegii Araki)
 Allium pskemense B.Fedtsch.
 Allium rhabdotum Stearn
 Allium vavilovii Popov & Vved.
 Section Condensatum N. Friesen
 Eastern Siberia and Mongolia north to Korea and Japan
 Allium condensatum Turcz.
 Section Sacculiferum P.P.Gritz.
 Allium chinense G.Don (Syn. Allium bakeri Regel) Chinese onion
 Allium linearifolium H.J.Choi & B.U.Oh
 Allium longistylum Baker (Syn. A. jeholense Franch., A. hopeiense Nakai)
 Allium pseudojaponicum Makino
 Allium sacculiferum Maxim.
 Allium taquetii H.Lév.
 Allium thunbergii G.Don Type
 Allium virgunculae F.Maek. & Kitam.
 Section Schoenoprasum Dum.
 Allium altyncolicum N.Friesen
 Allium karelinii Poljakov (Syn. Allium schoenoprasum var. scaberrimum Regel)
 Allium ledebourianum Schult. & Schult. f.
 Allium maximowiczii Regel
 Allium oliganthum Kar. & Kir. (Syn. Allium stenophyllum Schrenk)
 Allium schmitzii Cout.
 Allium schoenoprasum L. Type chives

Species

Etymology 

The name Allium is ancient, and the plant was known to both the Romans and the Greeks. The name is thought to be Celtic in origin, meaning "to burn", in reference to its taste and smell. One of the earliest uses of the name in botany, was by Joseph Pitton de Tournefort (1656- 1708).

Notes

References

Bibliography

Books

Chapters 

 , in 
 , in

Articles and theses

Phylogenetics

Subgenera and sections
 Line 1
 
 
 Line 2
 
 
 
 
 Line 3
 
 
subgen. Allium
 
sect. Codonoprasum

Websites 

 
 
 Pacific Bulb Society: Allium
 Pacific Bulb Society: Rhizomatous Alliums

Databases

External links 
 
 

 
Allium